High School Rock is an album by the Huntingtons released in 1998 on Tooth & Nail Records, the band's first for the label. A remastered version was released in 2009, available as a digital download. According to the band, the album was remastered to get it sounding the way they always wanted it to sound. The remastered version includes a bonus track previously only available on vinyl. In 2021, this album was re-released by Sexy Baby Records on cassette tape with newly designed artwork.

Track listing
 High School Rock-N-Roll
 We Don't Care
 FFT
 Aloha, It's You
 I Don't Wanna Sit Around With You
 When I Think About Her
 Jeannie Hates The Ramones
 I'm No Good
 Pencil Neck
 Stinky's All Grown Up
 1985
 How Can I Miss You If You Won't Go Away?
 Dies Saugt
 No Luck Again
 Jackie Is An Atheist
 Avi Is A Vampire

Personnel
Mikey Huntington: vocals, bass
Cliffy Huntington: guitar, vocals
Mikee Huntington: drums
Bradley Huntington: guitar, vocals

Additional musicians
Teakettle Jones – casiotone
Zac Damon – additional vocals on tracks 6, 7, 8 and 15
Dan Lumley – tambourine

Production
Produced and Engineered by Mass Giorgini
Assisted by Zac Damon, Denny Muller, and Fergus Daly
Drum Tech: Dan LumleyMixed, Edited and Sequenced by Mass Giorgini.
Mastered by Brian Gardner at Bernie Grundman's
Executive Producer: Brandon Ebel

References

External links
Huntingtons blog
Tooth & Nail Records Huntingtons page
High School Rock Remastered on Decapolis

The Huntingtons albums
1998 albums
Tooth & Nail Records albums